The 2003 NCAA Division I Women's Golf Championships were contested at the 22nd annual NCAA-sanctioned golf tournament to determine the individual and team national champions of women's Division I collegiate golf in the United States.

The tournament was held at the Birck Boilermaker Golf Complex in West Lafayette, Indiana.

USC won the team championship, the Trojans' first.

Mikaela Parmlid, also from USC, won the individual title.

Individual results

Individual champion
 Mikaela Parmlid, USC (297, +13)

Team leaderboard

 DC = Defending champion
 Debut appearance

References

NCAA Women's Golf Championship
Golf in Indiana
NCAA Women's Golf Championship
NCAA Women's Golf Championship
NCAA Women's Golf Championship